Beaver Brook is a former MBTA Commuter Rail station in Waltham, Massachusetts. It served the Fitchburg Line. It was located near Main Street east of the center of town, and was named after a nearby brook of the same name.

History

The grade crossing of Main Street (Route 20) at the station was proposed for elimination in 1913 and 1923; it was finally replaced by a bridge slightly to the east in 1935–36 – the first grade crossing elimination conducted as a Works Progress Administration project. 

In December 1958, Beaver Brook was one of eleven stations – four commuter rail stations in Waltham and Weston, and seven stops west of Fitchburg – on the Fitchburg Route proposed for closure.

The station was closed in June 1978 along with Clematis Brook station on the Fitchburg Line and Winchester Highlands station on the Lowell Line. All three stops served only rush hour trains at the time of their closing. The station building is no longer extant, but a short section of platform remains.

References

External links

Station location on Google Maps Street View

MBTA Commuter Rail stations in Middlesex County, Massachusetts
Former MBTA stations in Massachusetts
Waltham, Massachusetts
Railway stations closed in 1978
1978 disestablishments in Massachusetts